Luigi Amaducci (4 March 1924 – 3 May 2010) was the Catholic archbishop of the Archsdiocese of Ravenna-Cervia, Italy.

Episcopacy
Luigi Amaducci was ordained to the priesthood on 5 April 1947. Amaducci was named bishop of what is now the Roman Catholic Diocese of Cesena-Sarsina on 28 May 1977 and was consecrated on 18 June 1977. On 27 October 1990 Amaducci was appointed archbishop of the Diocese of Ravenna-Cervia prior to retiring on 9 March 2000.

References

1924 births
2010 deaths
Archbishops of Ravenna
Bishops in Emilia-Romagna